Lloyd Ward Haddon (born August 10, 1938) is a Canadian former ice hockey player who played 8 games in the National Hockey League with the Detroit Red Wings during the 1959–60 season. The rest of his career, which lasted from 1959 to 1965, was spent in the minor leagues.

Career statistics

Regular season and playoffs

External links
 

1938 births
Living people
Canadian ice hockey defencemen
Detroit Red Wings players
Edmonton Flyers (WHL) players
Hamilton Tiger Cubs players
Hershey Bears players
Ice hockey people from Ontario
Los Angeles Blades (WHL) players
St. Louis Braves players
Sportspeople from Sarnia